Božidar Adžija (24 December 1890 – 9 July 1941) was a Yugoslav communist politician and publicist.

Biography
A native of Drniš in the Kingdom of Dalmatia (present-day Croatia), of Croat and Serb descent, Adžija participated in World War I as a soldier in Austro-Hungarian Army. Prior to that, he went to Prague to study law, completing his doctorate in 1914.

After the war and collapse of Austria-Hungary, in 1919 he became labour policy commissioner in local Zagreb government. As an avid Social Democrat, he was member of various left-wing and Marxist parties and wrote many articles about labour and social issues. His views gradually shifted towards Communism and in 1934 he joined Communist Party of Yugoslavia. Because of that he was often arrested, the last such occasion being in March 1941, only days before the Axis invasion of Yugoslavia.

When Yugoslavia collapsed and the Nazi puppet state of Independent State of Croatia was established few weeks later, Adžija was kept in the Kerestinec prison together with many other members of Croatian left-wing intelligentsia. The Ustaša authorities had Adžija shot - together with Zvonimir Richtmann, Otokar Keršovani and Ognjen Prica - as a retaliation for Partisan activity. Adžija posthumously received the title of People's Hero of Yugoslavia.

References

1890 births
1941 deaths
People from Drniš
People from the Kingdom of Dalmatia
Serbs of Croatia
League of Communists of Croatia politicians
Austro-Hungarian military personnel of World War I
Croatian people of World War II
Yugoslav civilians killed in World War II
People executed by the Independent State of Croatia
Recipients of the Order of the People's Hero